Šentjanž nad Dravčami is a settlement in the Pohorje Hills in the Municipality of Vuzenica in northern Slovenia. The settlement, and the municipality, are included in the Carinthia Statistical Region, which is in the Slovenian portion of the historical Duchy of Styria.

The local church, from which the settlement gets its name, is dedicated to John the Baptist ( or Šentjanž) and belongs to the Parish of Vuzenica. It developed from an early 14th-century chapel that was extended in the 15th century.

References

External links
Šentjanž nad Dravčami on Geopedia

Populated places in the Municipality of Vuzenica